Nesson Public School District 2 is a school district headquartered in Ray, North Dakota, consisting of Ray Public School.

Within Williams County it serves Ray, Epping, Springbrook, and Wildrose. A small section is in Divide County.

Prior to the 2021 disestablishment of the New School District 8 (later the Williams County School District 8), some students from that district went to Ray Public School for high school.

History
In 2000 Heidi Heitkamp, the Attorney General of North Dakota, stated that the district violated the North Dakota Open Meetings Act by closing a meeting to the public.

Circa 2017 the district had received a rapid enrollment grant.

References

External links
 Nesson School District
School districts in North Dakota
Divide County, North Dakota
Education in Williams County, North Dakota